Cloherty is a surname. Notable people with the surname include:

Colin Cloherty (born 1987), American football player
Patricia Cloherty, American businesswoman